Bryan Thomas may refer to:

Bryan Thomas (American football) (born 1979), American football player
Bryan Thomas (canoeist) (born 1961), Australian canoeist
Bryan M. Thomas (1836–1905), American general
Bryan Thomas (architect) (born 1927/8), British architect

See also
Brian Thomas (disambiguation)
Thomas Bryan (disambiguation)